Gail O'Neill (c. 1963) is a former fashion model, who has become a television journalist.  As a fashion model, she was considered one of the elite African American models in the world.  She has been on covers of leading fashion magazines and a part of the highly publicized  Sports Illustrated Swimsuit Issue. As a journalist, she has been a correspondent for a variety of US networks.  She was an original correspondent for The Early Show on CBS and has also worked for CNN and HGTV.  As of 2009, she continues to model actively.

A native of Westchester County, New York, O'Neill worked for Xerox after graduation as a marketing rep.

Modeling
After graduating from Wesleyan University, she began an international modeling career that included appearances on the covers of Vogue and Mademoiselle, as well as catalogue work for companies such as J. Crew and  Nordstrom.  She was a spokesperson for Liz Claiborne.  She was an A-list fashion model in the 1980s  when she frequently appeared on fashion magazines. As a model she was known for refusing to appear in advertisements for cigarettes or for corporate sponsors that did not divest of South African investments. She appeared in the 1992 Sports Illustrated Swimsuit Issue.  In the 1990s she was an activist for the homeless as part of the Black Girls Coalition with about twenty of the world's elite black supermodels.

Journalism
O'Neill's journalism career has included freelance work for numerous television networks. She was an original correspondent for CBS's The Early Show, which debuted in 1999, where she presented "Box Office Plus", a regular Monday feature.  She had a reputation for being more skeptical and less of a cheerleader for the movie industry than her movie news correspondent peers on other networks.

Subsequently, she performed as a host of CNN's weekly Travel Now series.  She also served CNN as a correspondent covering other events.

From 2004 to 2006, she hosted HGTV's Mission Organization, where she matched professional organizers with those in need of organization and remodeling.

The White House has a tradition of inviting volunteers to assist with the holiday decorations.  In 2005, they invited 50 volunteers.  O'Neill hosted The White House Christmas 2005 for HGTV, and spoke with United States First Lady Laura Bush about the decorations and themes.

In 2008, she was mentioned in retrospectives lamenting the state of the fashion world for black models in magazines like Ebony and Italian Vogue.  The July 2008 Vogue Italia carried the headline "A Black Issue" and was dedicated to issues related to a lack of diversity in the fashion modeling industry, especially print ads, runway shows, and fashion editorials.  O'Neill was photographed by Steven Meisel in its first photo spread.

O'Neill continues to model actively, and she modeled for the 2009 Spring/Summer Calvin Klein ckOne fragrance campaign.

Notes

External links
Gail O'Neill at: Internet Movie Database, models.com, TV.com

American female models
People from Westchester County, New York
Wesleyan University alumni
1960s births
Living people
21st-century American women